

Events

January–March 
 January 1 – Ellis Island begins accommodating immigrants to the United States.
 February 1 – The historic Enterprise Bar and Grill is established in Rico, Colorado. 
 February 27 – Rudolf Diesel applies for a patent, on his compression ignition engine (the Diesel engine).
 February 29 – St. Petersburg, Florida is incorporated as a town.
 March 1 – Theodoros Deligiannis ends his term as Prime Minister of Greece and Konstantinos Konstantopoulos takes office.
 March 6–8 – "Exclusive Agreement": Rulers of the Trucial States (Abu Dhabi, Dubai, Sharjah, Ajman, Ras al-Khaimah and Umm al-Quwain) sign an agreement, by which they become de facto British protectorates.
 March 11 – The first basketball game is played in public, between students and faculty at the Springfield YMCA before 200 spectators. The final score is 5–1 in favor of the students, with the only goal for the faculty being scored by Amos Alonzo Stagg.
 March 13 – Ernest Louis, a grandson of Queen Victoria, becomes Grand Duke of Hesse and the Rhine on the death of his father, Grand Duke Louis IV.
 March 15
 The Liverpool Football Club is founded in England by John Houlding, the owner of Anfield; Houlding decides to form his own team after Everton leaves Anfield, in an argument over rent.
 Jesse W. Reno patents the first escalator, installed at Coney Beach.
 March 17 – The St. Patrick's Day Snowstorm besieges Tennessee with upwards of 26 inches of snow, establishing accumulation records that still stand.
 March 18 – Sir Frederick Stanley, Governor General of Canada, announces his intention to donate the Stanley Cup for ice hockey.
 March 20 – The first ever French rugby championship final takes place in Paris. Pierre de Coubertin referees the match, which Racing Club de France wins 4–3 over Stade Français.
 March 31 – The world's first fingerprinting bureau is formally opened by the Buenos Aires Chief of Police; it has been operating unofficially since the previous year.

April–June 
 April – The Johnson County War breaks out between small farmers and large ranchers in Wyoming.
 April 15 – The General Electric Company is established through the merger of the Thomson-Houston Company and the Edison General Electric Company.
 May 7 – The Cook Islands issue their first postage stamps.
 May 11 – The 18th Kentucky Derby is run in Louisville, Kentucky; Azra finishes first, Huron second and Phil Dwyer third in a race with only three horses.  
 May 19 – Battle of Yemoja River: British troops defeat Ijebu infantry in modern-day Nigeria, using a maxim gun.
 May 20 – The last broad gauge train runs from Paddington on the Great Western Railway of England.
 May 22 – The British conquest of Ijebu Ode marks a major extension of colonial power into the Nigerian interior.
 May 24 – Prince George (later George V of the United Kingdom) becomes Duke of York.
 June 5 – An oil fire in Oil City, Pennsylvania, United States, kills 130 people.
 June 7 – Homer Plessy, an octoroon, is arrested for deliberately sitting in a whites-only railroad car in Louisiana, leading to the landmark Plessy v. Ferguson court case, an unsuccessful attempt to challenge "separate but equal" race legislation in the United States.
 June 11
 The Limelight Department, later one of the world's first film studios, is officially established in Melbourne, Australia.
 Stockholms allmänna kvinnoklubb (Stockholm Public Women's Club) is founded.
 June 30 – The Homestead Strike begins in Homestead, Pennsylvania, culminating in a battle between striking workers and private security agents on July 6.

July–September 
 July 4 – Samoa changes its time zone to being 3 hours behind California, such that it crosses the International Date Line, and July 4 occurs twice.
 July 4–18 – British general election: The Conservative and Liberal Unionist coalition government loses its majority in the House of Commons, eventually leading to Prime Minister Lord Salisbury's resignation on August 12.
 July 6
 Dr. José Rizal, Filipino writer, philosopher and political activist, is arrested by Spanish authorities in connection with La Liga Filipina.
 Homestead Strike: The arrival of a force of 300 Pinkerton detectives from New York and Chicago results in a fight in which about 10 men are killed.
 July 8 – The Great Fire of 1892 devastates the city of St. John's, Newfoundland.
 July 12 – A hidden lake bursts out of a glacier on the side of Mont Blanc, flooding the valley below and killing around 200 villagers and holidaymakers in Saint-Gervais-les-Bains.
 July 13 – The United International Bureau for the Protection of Intellectual Property (UIBPIP or BIRPI) is established in Bern, Switzerland.
 July 25 – The Community of the Resurrection, an Anglican religious community for men, is founded by Charles Gore and Walter Frere, initially in Oxford.
 August – The first electric light bulb in Bulgaria is used at the Plovdiv Fair.
 August 4
 The father and stepmother of Lizzie Borden are found murdered in their Fall River, Massachusetts home; she will be acquitted of their murder.
 Franklin Park, Illinois is incorporated as a village.
 August 9 – Thomas Edison receives a patent for a two-way telegraph.
 August 15 – Valparaíso, Chile founds its first football team, Santiago Wanderers.
 August 18 – William Ewart Gladstone assumes the U.K. premiership, as head of the Liberal government, with Irish Nationalist Party support.
 September 3 – The Nottingham Forest Football Club plays their first league match in England, a 2–2 draw with Everton F.C.
 September 8 – The Pledge of Allegiance is first recited in the United States.
 September 9 – Amalthea, the fifth moon of Jupiter, is discovered by Edward Emerson Barnard.
 September 15 – Sergei Witte replaces Ivan Vyshnegradsky, as Russian finance minister.
 September – Women are first admitted to Yale University's graduate school.

October–December 
 October 1 – The University of Chicago holds its first classes.

 October 5
 The Dalton Gang, attempting to rob two banks in Coffeyville, Kansas, is shot by the townspeople; only Emmett Dalton, with 23 wounds, survives, to spend 14 years in prison.
 Master criminal Adam Worth is captured in Liège, Belgium, during an attempted robbery of a money delivery cart.
 October 12 – To mark the 400th anniversary Columbus Day holiday, the "Pledge of Allegiance" is first recited in unison by students in U.S. public schools.
 October 30 – The Historical American Exposition opens in Madrid.
 October 31 – The first collection of Arthur Conan Doyle's Sherlock Holmes stories from The Strand Magazine, The Adventures of Sherlock Holmes, is published in London.
 November 2 – The first football club in Bohemia, Slavia Praha is established, originally under name of Akademický cyklistický odbor Slavia (A.C.O.S.), focusing on cycling.
 November 8
 1892 United States presidential election: Grover Cleveland is elected over Benjamin Harrison and James B. Weaver, to win the second of his non-consecutive terms.
 An anarchist bomb kills six in a police station in Avenue de l'Opéra, Paris.
 The four-day New Orleans General Strike begins.
 November 17 – French troops occupy Abomey, capital of the kingdom of Dahomey.
 November 24 – The Hotel Zinzendorf catches fire in the city of Winston-Salem, North Carolina; 45 people die.
 December 5 – John Thompson becomes Canada's fourth prime minister.
 December 17 – First issue of Vogue is published in the United States.
 December 18 – The Nutcracker ballet, with music by Pyotr Ilyich Tchaikovsky, is premiered at the Imperial Mariinsky Theatre in Saint Petersburg, Russia.
 December 22 – The Newcastle East End F.C. is renamed Newcastle United F.C., following the demise of the Newcastle West End F.C. and East End's move to St James' Park, formerly West End's home, in the north east of England.

Date unknown 
 Andrew Carnegie combines all of his separate businesses into the Carnegie Steel Company, allowing him to gain a monopoly in the United States steel industry.
 Diplomat Henry Galway secures a treaty by which Ovonramwen, Oba of Benin, ostensibly accepts British protection for his kingdom.
 A cholera outbreak occurs in Hamburg, Germany.
 A 50-year-old tortoise called Timothy, previously serving as a naval mascot, is brought to the estate of Powderham Castle in England, where she lives until her death in 2004.
 Viruses are first described by Russian biologist Dmitri Ivanovsky.

Births

January 

 January 1
 Artur Rodziński, Polish conductor (d. 1958)
 Manuel Roxas, 5th President of the Philippines (d. 1948)
 January 3 – J. R. R. Tolkien, English professor, linguist, philologist, conlanger and author of The Lord of the Rings, The Hobbit and The Silmarillion (d. 1973)
 January 12 – Mikhail Kirponos, Soviet general (d. 1941)
 January 14
 Martin Niemöller, German prisoner in the Nazi Holocaust (d. 1984)
 Hal Roach, American film, television producer (d. 1992)
 January 15 – Rex Ingram, Irish film director (d. 1950)
 January 18
 Oliver Hardy, American comedian, actor (d. 1957)
 Paul Rostock, German surgeon (d. 1956)
 January 19 – Ólafur Thors, Icelandic politician, 5-times prime minister (d. 1964)
 January 22 – Marcel Dassault, French aircraft industrialist (d. 1986)
 January 25 – Takeo Takagi, Japanese admiral (d. 1944)
 January 26 – Zara Cully, American actress (d. 1978)
 January 28
Luke Jordan, American blues singer, guitarist (d. 1952)
Ernst Lubitsch, German-born film director (d. 1947)
Fyodor Raskolnikov, Soviet revolutionary, writer, journalist, naval commander and diplomat (d. 1939)
 January 31 – Eddie Cantor, American actor, singer (d. 1964)

February 
 February 3 – Juan Negrín, Spanish physician, politician and 67th Prime Minister of Spain (d. 1956)
 February 4 – Yrjö Kilpinen, Finnish composer (d. 1959)
 February 5 – Shunji Isaki, Japanese admiral (d. 1943)
 February 6
 Sir John Carden, 6th Baronet, English tank, vehicle designer (d. 1935)
 William P. Murphy, American physician, recipient of the Nobel Prize in Physiology or Medicine (d. 1987)
 February 9 – Peggy Wood, American actress (d. 1978)
 February 10 – Alan Hale Sr., American actor (d. 1950)
 February 13 – Robert H. Jackson, Associate Justice of the Supreme Court of the United States, chief prosecutor at the Nuremberg Trials (d. 1954)
 February 14 – Radola Gajda, Czech commander and politician (d. 1948)
 February 15 – James Forrestal, first United States Secretary of Defense (d. 1949)
 February 18 – Wendell Willkie, U.S. Republican presidential candidate (d. 1944)
 February 21 – Harry Stack Sullivan, American psychiatrist, psychoanalyst (d. 1949)
 February 22
Gheorghe Cosma, Romanian general (d. 1969)
Edna St. Vincent Millay, American writer (d. 1950)
 February 23
Ioan Arbore, Romanian general (d. 1954)
Kathleen Harrison, English actress (d. 1995)
 February 24 – Konstantin Fedin, Russian writer (d. 1977)
 February 27 – William Demarest, American actor (d. 1983)
 February 29
 Ed Appleton, American baseball player (d. 1932)
 Augusta Savage, American sculptor (d. 1962)

March 

 March 1 – Ryūnosuke Akutagawa, Japanese writer (d. 1927)
 March 3 – Mississippi John Hurt (some sources give his year of birth as 1893), American country blues singer, guitarist (d. 1966) 
 March 8 – Constantin Brătescu, Romanian general (d. 1971)
 March 9
 Arthur Caesar, American screenwriter (d. 1953)
 David Garnett, English novelist and writer (d. 1981)
 Mátyás Rákosi, 43rd prime minister of Hungary (d. 1971)
 Vita Sackville-West, English writer and gardener (d. 1962)
 March 10
 Arthur Honegger, French-born Swiss composer (d. 1955)
 Gregory La Cava, American director, producer and writer (d. 1952)
 Eva Turner, English operatic soprano (d. 1990)
 March 15 – Charles Nungesser, French aviator, World War I fighter ace (d. 1927)
 March 16 – César Vallejo, Peruvian poet (d. 1938)
 March 25 – Andy Clyde, Scottish-born screen actor (d. 1967)
 March 27 – Ferde Grofé, American pianist, composer (d. 1972)
 March 28
 Corneille Heymans, Belgian physiologist, Nobel Prize laureate (d. 1968)
 Tom Maguire, Irish Republican (d. 1993)
 March 30
 Stefan Banach, Polish mathematician (d. 1945)
 Erhard Milch, German field marshal, Luftwaffe officer (d. 1972)
 Sanzō Nosaka, Japanese Communist Party chairman and leader of JPEL (d. 1993)
 March 31 – Stanisław Maczek, Polish general (d. 1994)

April 
 April 4 – Italo Mus, Italian painter (d. 1967)
 April 6
 Donald Wills Douglas, American industrialist (d. 1981)
 Lowell Thomas, American journalist (d. 1981)
 April 7 – Julius Hirsch, German footballer (d. 1945)
 April 8 – Mary Pickford, Canadian actress, studio founder (d. 1979)
 April 12 – Johnny Dodds, American jazz clarinettist (d. 1940)
 April 12 – Henry Darger, reclusive American outsider artist (d. 1973)
 April 13 
 Sir Arthur Harris, 1st Baronet, British World War II Royal Air Force commander (d. 1984)
 Sir Robert Alexander Watson-Watt, British (Scottish) inventor of radar (d. 1973)
 April 16 – Ferenc Kiss, Hungarian actor (d. 1978)
 April 19 – Germaine Tailleferre, French composer (d. 1983)
 April 26 – Richard L. Conolly, American admiral (d. 1962)
 April 27 – Raizō Tanaka, Japanese admiral (d. 1969)
 April 28 – Joseph Dunninger, American mentalist (d. 1975)

May 

 May 2 – Manfred von Richthofen (the "Red Baron"), German World War I fighter pilot (d. 1918)
 May 3  
 George Paget Thomson, English physicist, Nobel Prize laureate (d. 1975)
 Jacob Viner, Canadian economist (d. 1970)
 May 4 – Stanisława Paleolog, Polish official, military and political activist (d. 1968)
 May 5 – Rajarsi Janakananda, born James J. Lynn, American millionaire and disciple of Paramahansa Yogananda (d. 1955)
 May 7
 Archibald MacLeish, American poet (d. 1982)
 Josip Broz Tito, President of Yugoslavia (d. 1980)
 May 8 – Luigi Del Bianco, Italian-American sculptor (d. 1969)
 May 9 –  Zita of Bourbon-Parma, Empress of Austria-Hungary (d. 1989)
 May 11
Shintarō Hashimoto, Japanese admiral (d. 1945)
Margaret Rutherford, English actress (d. 1972)
 May 12 – Fritz Kortner, Austrian-born director (d. 1970)
 May 14 – Theodor Burchardi, German admiral (d. 1983)
 May 15 – Shigeyoshi Miwa, Japanese admiral (d. 1959)
 May 16 
Manton S. Eddy, American general (d. 1962)
Osgood Perkins, American actor (d. 1937)
 May 18 – Ezio Pinza, Italian bass (d. 1957)
 May 19 – Pops Foster, American jazz bass player (d. 1969)
 May 23 – Pichichi, Spanish footballer (d. 1922)
 May 26 – Maxwell Bodenheim, American poet and novelist (k. 1954)
 May 30 – Fernando Amorsolo, Filipino painter (d. 1972)
 May 31
 Michel Kikoine, Belarusian painter (d. 1968)
 Gregor Strasser, German Nazi politician (d. 1934)

June 
 June 1 – Amānullāh Khān, ruler of Afghanistan (d. 1960)
 June 8 – Nikolai Nikolaevich Polikarpov, Soviet aeronautical engineer, aircraft designer (d. 1944)
 June 13 – Basil Rathbone, British actor (d. 1967)
 June 21
 Reinhold Niebuhr, American theologian (d. 1971)
 Hilding Rosenberg, Swedish composer (d. 1985)
 June 22 – Robert Ritter von Greim, German field marshal (d. 1945)
 June 23 – Mieczysław Horszowski, Polish pianist (d. 1993)
 June 25
 Katherine K. Davis, American composer (d. 1980)
 Shirō Ishii, Japanese microbiologist, lieutenant general of Unit 731 (d. 1959)
 June 26 – Pearl S. Buck, American writer, Nobel Prize laureate (d. 1973)
 June 27 – Alexandru Batcu, Romanian general (d. 1964)
 June 28 
 Clifford Campbell, Jamaican educator, politician (d. 1991)
 E. H. Carr, English historian, diplomat, journalist and international relations theorist (d. 1982)
 June 30 – Oswald Pohl, German S.S. officer (d. 1951)

July 

 July 1 
 James M. Cain, American author and journalist (d. 1977)
 Anders Engberg, Swedish supercentenarian (d. 2003)
 July 4 
 A. G. Gaston, American businessman (d. 1996)
 Henry M. Mullinnix, American admiral (d. 1943)
 July 6 – Willy Coppens, Belgian World War I flying ace (d. 1986)
 July 8
 Richard Aldington, English poet (d. 1962)
 Dean O'Banion, American gangster (d. 1924)
 Victor Hubert Tait, Canadian soldier (d. 1988)
 July 9 – Cromwell Dixon, American pioneer aviator (d. 1911)
 July 11
Trafford Leigh-Mallory, British aviator and Royal Air Force Air Chief Marshal (d. 1944)
Thomas Mitchell, American actor (d. 1962)
 July 12 – Bruno Schulz, Polish writer and painter (d. 1942)
 July 13 – Jonni Myyrä, Finnish-American athlete (d. 1955)
 July 15
 Walter Benjamin, German philosopher and cultural critic (suicide 1940)
 Milena Rudnytska, Ukrainian educator, women's activist, politician and writer (d. 1979)
 July 16
 Constantion Bădescu, Romanian general (d. 1962)
 Michel Coiffard, French World War I fighter ace (d. 1918)
 July 17 – Edwin Harris Dunning, British aviator (d. 1917)
 July 21 - Lenore Ulric, American actress (d. 1970)
 July 22 – Arthur Seyss-Inquart, Austrian Nazi politician (d. 1946)
 July 23 – Haile Selassie I, Ethiopian emperor (d. 1975)
 July 26 – Sad Sam Jones, American baseball player (d. 1966)
 July 28 – K. Kanagaratnam, Ceylon Tamil civil servant, politician (d. 1952)
 July 29 – William Powell, American actor (d. 1984)

August 

 August 1
Mihail Cămărașu, Romanian general (d. 1962)
Kinsan Ginsan, Japanese twin centenarians (d. 2000) and (d. 2001)
 August 2 – Jack L. Warner, Canadian film producer (d. 1978)
 August 6 
 Edith Achilles, American psychologist (d. 1989)
 Hoot Gibson, American actor, film director (d. 1962)
 August 11
Władysław Anders, Polish general, politician (d. 1970)
Hugh MacDiarmid, Scottish poet (d. 1978)
 August 12 – Alfred Lunt, American actor, stage director (d. 1977)
 August 15
 Louis de Broglie, French physicist, Nobel Prize laureate (d. 1987)
 Walther Nehring, German general (d. 1983)
 August 16 – Otto Messmer, American cartoonist (d. 1983)
 August 17 – Tamon Yamaguchi, Japanese admiral (d. 1942)
 August 19 – Elizabeth Kozlova, Russian ornithologist (d. 1975)
 August 25 – Gabriel Guérin, French World War I fighter ace (d. 1918)
 August 26 – Elizebeth Smith Friedman, American cryptographer (d. 1980)

September 

 September 4 – Darius Milhaud, French composer (d. 1974)
 September 5
 Hugo Österman, Finnish general (d. 1975)
 Joseph Szigeti, Hungarian violinist (d. 1973)
 September 6 – Edward Victor Appleton, English physicist, Nobel Prize laureate (d. 1965)
 September 9 – Tsuru Aoki, Japanese American actress (d. 1961)
 September 10 – Arthur Compton, American physicist, Nobel Prize laureate (d. 1962)
 September 11 – Pinto Colvig, American vaudeville actor, radio actor, newspaper cartoonist, prolific movie voice actor and circus performer (original voice of Goofy) (d. 1967)
 September 12 – Alfred A. Knopf Sr., American publisher (d. 1984)
 September 20 – Patricia Collinge, Irish-American actress (d. 1974)

October 
 October 2 – Ilie Crețulescu, Romanian general (d. 1971)
 October 3 – Sentarō Ōmori, Japanese admiral (d. 1974)
 October 4 
 Engelbert Dollfuss, Austrian statesman, chancellor (d. 1934)
 Luis Trenker, South Tyrolean film producer, director, writer, actor, architect and alpinist (d. 1990)
 October 6 – Jackie Saunders, American silent movie actress (d. 1954)
 October 8 – Marina Tsvetaeva, Russian poet (d. 1941)
 October 9 – Ivo Andrić, Serbo-Croatian writer, Nobel Prize laureate (d. 1975)
 October 12 – Giovanni De Briganti, Italian aviator (d. 1937)
 October 13 – Malcolm McGregor, American silent film actor (d. 1945)
 October 14 – Andrei Yeremenko, Soviet military leader, Marshal of the Soviet Union (d. 1970)
 October 16
Kiyonao Ichiki, Japanese army officer (d. 1942)
Józef Kustroń, Polish general (d. 1939)
 October 17 – R. K. Shanmukham Chetty, Indian jurist, economist (d. 1953)
 October 23 – Gummo Marx, American actor, comedian (d. 1977)
 October 27 – Graciliano Ramos, Brazilian writer (d. 1953)
 October 28 – Dink Johnson, American jazz musician (d. 1954)
 October 29 – Stanisław Ostrowski, former President of Poland (d. 1982)
 October 30 – Charles Atlas, Italian-American strongman, sideshow performer (d. 1972)
 October 31 – Alexander Alekhine, Russian chess champion (d. 1946)

November 

 November 2 – Alice Brady, American actress (d. 1939)
 November 5 – J. B. S. Haldane, British geneticist (d. 1964)
 November 9 – Erich Auerbach, German philologist (d. 1957)
 November 11 – Isidor Achron, Polish-American pianist, composer and brother of Joseph Achron (d. 1948)
 November 12 – Guo Moruo, Chinese author, poet (d. 1978)
 November 14 – Dieudonné Costes, French aviator (d. 1973)
 November 16
Richard Hale, American singer, actor (d. 1981)
Tazio Nuvolari, Italian racing driver (d. 1953)
November 20
James Collip, Canadian biochemist (d. 1965)
 November 22 – Emma Tillman, American supercentenarian, briefly the world's oldest living person and last surviving person born in 1892 (d. 2007)
 November 24 – Daniel McVey, Australian public servant (d. 1972)

December 
 December 4 – Francisco Franco, Spanish dictator (d. 1975)
 December 5 – Cyril Ring, American film actor (d. 1967)
 December 6 – Osbert Sitwell, English writer (d. 1969)
 December 7 – Max Ehrlich, German actor, screenwriter and humor writer (d. 1944 in Auschwitz concentration camp)
 December 8 – Bert Hinkler, Australian pioneer aviator (d. 1933)
 December 9 – André Randall, French actor (d. 1974)
 December 11 – Arnold Majewski, Finnish military hero of Polish descent (d. 1942)
 December 12
Edward Almond, American general (d. 1979)
Herman Potočnik Noordung, Slovenian rocket engineer (d. 1929)
 December 15 – J. Paul Getty, American industrialist  (d. 1976)
 December 21
Amy Key Clarke, English mystical poet  (d. 1980)
Rebecca West, English author, journalist, literary critic and travel writer (d. 1983)
 December 24 – Ruth Chatterton, American actress, novelist and aviator (d. 1961)
 December 26 – Don Barclay, American actor (d. 1975)
 December 27 – Alfred Edwin McKay, Canadian World War I flying ace (d. 1917)
 December 29 – Emory Parnell, American actor (d. 1979)
 December 31 – Stanley Price, American film, television actor (d. 1955)

Date unknown 
 Alexandru Beldiceanu, Romanian general (d. 1982)
 Ahmad Daouk, two-time prime minister of Lebanon (d. 1979)
 Gerald Haxton, secretary and lover of W. Somerset Maugham (d. 1944)
 Abdallah Khalil, third Prime Minister of Sudan (d. 1970)
 Genaro V. Vásquez, Mexican lawyer (d. 1967)
 V. Veerasingam, Ceylon Tamil teacher and politician (d. 1964)
 Wu Shuqing, Chinese feminist, nationalist and revolutionary

Deaths

January–June 

 January 2 – Sir George Biddell Airy, English astronomer royal (b. 1801)
 January 7 – Tewfik Pasha, Khedive of Egypt and the Sudan (b. 1852)
 January 7 –  Maria Cederschiold, Swedish deaconess (b. 1815)
 January 8 – Christopher Raymond Perry Rodgers, American admiral (b. 1819)
 January 12 – William Reeves, Irish antiquarian (b. 1815)
 January 14 – Prince Albert Victor, Duke of Clarence and Avondale, second in line for the throne of the United Kingdom (b. 1864)
 January 21 – John Couch Adams, English astronomer (b. 1819)
 January 31 – Charles Spurgeon, English preacher (b. 1834)
 February 2 – Darinka Petrovic, princess consort of Montenegro (b. 1838)  
 February 5 – Emilie Flygare-Carlén, Swedish novelist (b. 1807)
 February 7 – Andrew Bryson, American admiral (b. 1822)
 February 25 – Charlotte Norberg, Swedish ballerina (b. 1824)
 February 27 – Louis Vuitton, French fashion designer (b. 1821)
 March 5 – Edmond Jurien de La Gravière, French admiral, naval historian and biographer (b. 1812)
 March 13 – Louis IV, Grand Duke of Hesse (b. 1837)
 March 16 – Samuel F. Miller, American politician (b. 1827)
 March 26 – Walt Whitman, American poet (b. 1819)
 March 28 – Emily Lucas Blackall, American author and philanthropist (b. 1832)
 April 4 – José María Castro Madriz, President of Costa Rica (b. 1818)
 April 12 – Ogarita Booth Henderson, American stage actress, daughter of John Wilkes Booth (b. 1859)
 April 17 – Alexander Mackenzie, 2nd Prime Minister of Canada (b. 1822)
 April 19 – Fr. Thomas Pelham Dale SSC, Anglo-Catholic clergyman prosecuted for Ritualist practices in the 1870s (b. 1821)
 April 21 – Emelie Tracy Y. Swett, American author (b. 1863)
 April 22 – Édouard Lalo, French composer (b. 1823)
 April 25 – William Backhouse Astor Jr., American businessman (b. 1830)
 April 26 – Sir Provo William Parry Wallis, British admiral, naval hero (b. 1791)
 May 5 – August Wilhelm von Hofmann, German chemist (b. 1818)
 May 8 – Gábor Baross, Hungarian statesman (b. 1848)
 May 22 – Alexander Campbell, Canadian politician (b. 1822)
 May 29 – Bahá'u'lláh, Persian founder of the Bahá'í Faith (b. 1817)
 May 30 – Mary H. Gray Clarke, American correspondent (b. 1835)
 June 8 
 Dimitrie Brătianu, 15th prime minister of Romania (b. 1818)
 Robert Ford, American assassin of Jesse James (b. 1862)
 June 9 
 William Grant Stairs, Canadian explorer (b. 1863)
 Yoshitoshi, Japanese artist (b. 1839)
 June 28 – Sir Harry Atkinson, 10th Premier of New Zealand (b. 1831)

July–December 

 July 18 – Rose Terry Cooke, American author (b. 1827)
 July 30 – Count Joseph Alexander Hübner, Austrian diplomat (b. 1811)
 August 4 – Ernestine Rose, Polish-born feminist (b. 1810)
 August 13 – Charles Lafontaine, Swiss mesmerist (b. 1803)
 August 23 – Deodoro da Fonseca, 1st president of Brazil (b. 1827)
 September 6 – Betty Bentley Beaumont, British merchant (b. 1828)
 September 7 – John Greenleaf Whittier, American poet, abolitionist (b. 1807)
 September 8 – Louisa Jane Hall, American literary critic (b. 1802)
 September 11 – Clarissa Caldwell Lathrop, American social reformer  (b. 1847)
 September 12 – John Cummings Howell, United States Navy admiral (b. 1819)
 October 2 – Ernest Renan, French philosopher, philologist, historian and writer (b. 1823) 
 October 5 – Bob Dalton, American Wild Western outlaw (b. 1869)
 October 6 
 Alfred, Lord Tennyson, English poet laureate (b. 1809)
 Jean-Antoine Villemin, French physician (b. 1827)
 October 23
 Abdyl Frashëri, Albanian politician (b. 1839)
 Emin Pasha, Ottoman-German doctor, Governor of Equatoria (b. 1840)
 October 24 – Mir-Fatah-Agha, Persian Shiite cleric
 October 25 – Caroline Harrison, First Lady of the United States (b. 1832)
 November 15 – Thomas Neill Cream, Scottish-Canadian serial killer (b. 1850)
 December – Eudora Stone Bumstead, American poet (b. 1860)
 December 1 – Mary Allen West, American superintendent of schools (b. 1837)
 December 2 – Jay Gould, American financier (b. 1836)
 December 6 – Werner von Siemens, German inventor, industrialist (b. 1816)
 December 11 – Nancy Edberg, Swedish pioneer of women's swimming (b. 1832)
 December 14 – Sir Adams Archibald, Canadian lawyer and politician (b. 1814)
 December 18
 John M. Lloyd, American bricklayer and police officer (b. 1835)
 Sir Richard Owen, English paleontologist (b. 1804)

References 

 
Leap years in the Gregorian calendar